Noel A. Coballes (born 7 February 1958) is a retired Filipino Lieutenant General and a two-time Distinguished Conduct Star recipient for combat actions in Maguindanao, and thrice recipient of Distinguished Service Star. He also was awarded five Gold Cross Medals, two Bronze Cross Medals, and more than one Military Merit Medals. He is the former Commanding General of the Philippine Army.

Biography
He graduated from Philippine Military Academy in 1980, 995 he led four different groups of Task Group Panthers in Basilan which liquidated numerous of Abu Sayyaf's terrorists which were accused of kidnaping of civilians. From 1997 to 2000, he was in charge of the 2nd Scout Ranger Battalion in both Maguindanao and North Cotabato. From 2001 to 2002 he led Filipino Peacekeeping Unit which was under the United Nations command in East Timor which made it to be an independent state. During the same years he also was in charge of the 1st Infantry Division in Basilan and 10th Infantry Division in Davao. From 1983 to 1984, he participated in both 1st Scout Ranger Regiment and Special Operations Command. From October 19, 2012, to January 22, 2013 he served as a Vice Chief of Staff of the Armed Forces of the Philippines, before assuming his last position as Commanding General of the Philippine Army. He was succeeded by Lieutenant General Hernando Iriberri on February 7, 2014, and retired the same day.

He completed various courses, such as the 1st Scout Ranger Regiment Course in 1980, the Infantry Officer Basic Course in 1987, and the Infantry Officer Advance Course in Fort Benning, Georgia (U.S. state). He also completed the Philippine Army Command and General Staff Course in 2000 and earned his Masters in Strategic Studies in the US Army War College in 2007.

Awards and decorations 

 Philippine Republic Presidential Unit Citation
 Martial Law Unit Citation
 People Power I Unit Citation
 People Power II Unit Citation
 Distinguished Conduct Star
  Gold Cross Medals
  Officer, Philippine Legion of Honor
  Gawad sa Kaunlaran
  Bronze Cross Medals
  Military Merit Medals with 4 bronze spearhead devices
  Silver Wing Medal
  Military Commendation Medals
  Military Civic Action Medal
  Sagisag ng Ulirang Kawal
  Long Service Medal
  United Nations Service Medal
  Anti-dissidence Campaign Medal
 Luzon Anti-Dissidence Campaign Medal
  Mindanao Anti-Dissidence Campaign Medal
  Disaster Relief and Rehabilitation Operations Ribbon
  Combat Commander's Badge (Philippines)
  Scout Ranger Qualification Badge
  Special Forces Qualification Badge
 Honorary Airborne Wings from the Royal Thai Army

References

Filipino generals
Living people
1958 births
People from Tuguegarao